Mahmoud Samir (born 2 July 1981) is an Egyptian former fencer. He competed in the sabre events at the 2000 and 2008 Summer Olympics.

References

External links
 

1981 births
Living people
Egyptian male sabre fencers
Olympic fencers of Egypt
Fencers at the 2000 Summer Olympics
Fencers at the 2008 Summer Olympics
Sportspeople from Cairo
20th-century Egyptian people
21st-century Egyptian people